The binomial name “Hadongsuchus” refers to the skull remain of an extinct "protosuchian" crocodylomorph from the Hasandong Formation of Hadong, South Korea.

Discovery
The Hasandong Formation has been dated to the late Aptian and earliest Albian, between 118.0 ± 2.6 Ma and 112.4  ± 1.3 Ma. Dinosaur remains diagnostic to the genus level are among the fossils that have been recovered from the formation. Tracks of the pterosaur ichnogenus Pteraichnus have also been recovered from the unit. A complete fossil skull was discovered in 2002, and the genus was named in 2005 on the basis of this holotype. Certain features of the third premaxillary tooth help distinguish it from other related crocodylomorphs. The estimated size of Hadongsuchus was around 50 cm in length. Like other protosuchians, it is believed to have been a fully terrestrial cursorial animal with a semi-erect posture. The binomial name of the type species H. acerdentis means "sharp-toothed crocodile from Hadong" in Greek. The name is a nomen nudum, for the binomial name isn't approved officially but only stated in the symposium from China in 2005, which means that the name doesn't match the conditions to be the binomial name that can be internationally approved according to the International Commission on Zoological Nomenclature.

Systematics
Hadongsuchus was recovered as a close relative of Shantungosuchus, Sichuanosuchus, and Zosuchus by Hangjae et al. (2005).

References

Early Cretaceous crocodylomorphs of Asia
Terrestrial crocodylomorphs
Early Cretaceous reptiles of Asia

Nomina nuda